Grover Township is an inactive township in Johnson County, in the U.S. state of Missouri.

Grover Township was established in 1869, and named after B. W. Grover, a pioneer citizen.

References

Townships in Missouri
Townships in Johnson County, Missouri